Walter Ingleton (16 February 1867 – 4 January 1923) was an Australian cricketer. He played five first-class cricket matches for Victoria between 1890 and 1897.

See also
 List of Victoria first-class cricketers

References

External links
 

1867 births
1923 deaths
Australian cricketers
Victoria cricketers
Cricketers from Melbourne